Kociewie is an ethnocultural region in the eastern part of Tuchola Forest, in northern Poland, Pomerania, south of Gdańsk. Its cultural capital is Starogard Gdański, the biggest town is Tczew, while other major towns include Świecie, Pelplin, and Skórcz. The region has about 250,000 inhabitants.  It has well-developed industry and agriculture.

Kociewians

The Kociewians are a Polish  ethnographical group. Most of the Kociewiacy are Roman Catholics. They live next to a far more prominent ethnic group in the area, the Kashubians. In the 2011 census, 3065 individuals declared themselves as Kociewiacy, an increase since the census of 2002, when nobody identified as such. Kocievian dialect, unlike Kashubian, is mostly intelligible with mainstream Polish language. Despite geographic proximity, these two dialects are very dissimilar, with Kocievian being much closer to Kuyavian, to the point of some scholars calling it a variant of that dialect.
The IETF language tags have assigned the variant  to the Kociewie dialect of Polish.

Genetics 
In a 2013 study, Y-DNA haplogroups among the Polish population indigenous to Kociewie (n=158) were reported as follows:

56.3% R1a, 17.7% R1b, 8.2% I1, 7.6% I2, 3.8% E1b1b, 1.9% N1, 1.9% J and 2% of other haplogroups.

See also
Kashubia
Kashubians

References

Geography of West Pomeranian Voivodeship